The Democratic Party (DEMP), was a short-lived political party in Hungary between 1993 and 1994.

History
The Democratic Party's legal predecessor was the short-lived Democratic Smallholders' and Party (DKPP) which was established by former moderate liberal members of Independent Smallholders, Agrarian Workers and Civic Party (FKGP) on 19 January 1993. The DKPP criticized József Torgyán's leadership. The DKPP split when MP Vilmos Bereczki and his supporters founded the DEMP on 6 September 1993.

The DEMP had four individual candidates in the 1994 parliamentary election, who received 0.02 percent of the votes, failing to win a seat. Just before the December 1994 local elections, the DEMP was officially dissolved.

Election results

National Assembly

References

Sources

Defunct political parties in Hungary
Political parties established in 1993
Political parties disestablished in 1994
1993 establishments in Hungary
1994 disestablishments in Hungary